Project: ALF is a 1996 American made-for-television science fiction film directed by Dick Lowry which serves as a sequel to the final episode "Consider Me Gone" of the 1986–1990 sitcom ALF. It was broadcast in the U.S. by ABC and in Canada on CHCH-TV on February 17, 1996. The film was released on DVD in 2005.

The only actors to appear in both the series and film were Paul Fusco (the voice and puppeteer of ALF) and Beverly Archer (who played Mrs. Byrd on the TV series and Dr. Carnage in the film).

Plot
The film begins where ALF had ended, with Gordon Shumway—otherwise known as ALF, short for Alien Life Form—being captured by the US Air Force's Alien Task Force (ATF) while attempting to depart Earth. ALF is detained at Edmonds Air Force Base as ordered by Colonel Gilbert Milfoil, the ATF's head of security. Despite everyone's worst fears, ALF has been thriving in captivity. In fact, the poker games that he conducts in his cell with his guards, where he sells concessions and generally cleans up on the table, have made his life very cushy, similar to a bachelor pad; in fact, he has enough possessions to fill an aircraft hangar. Acting independently, Milfoil plans on killing his prisoner under the guise of a beauty treatment, for which he has left a paper trail implicating his aide de camp, Second Lieutenant Harold Reese. They discuss ALF's relationship with the Tanner family, who have moved to Iceland under the Witness Protection Program.

Learning of this, two Air Force scientists, Major Melissa Hill and Captain Rick Mullican, help ALF escape, hiding at a cheap motel. ALF's annoying behavior results in him being ordered to hide in the restroom, reminding him of when the Tanners would do the same. Unwilling to surrender his creature comforts, ALF sneaks outside and contacts one of his former guards in an attempt to arrange a supply drop, before mistakenly entering a strip club named “Kitty Kat Lounge”, assuming from its name that it is a restaurant that serves cats.

With both the local police and the military alerted, the trio turn to Dexter Moyers, a former NASA scientist falsely discredited by the government as part of the anti-UFO conspiracy. His solution is to publicly reveal ALF's existence on global television, removing the US government's credibility and vindicating himself, but Mullican grows increasingly uncomfortable with the idea. After accidentally stumbling across a computer file that hints at a deeper agenda, he departs during the night. The following day, he contacts a friend at Edmonds, aware that Milfoil will be monitoring the conversation and come directly to him. As predicted, he is arrested shortly after and brokers a deal, exchanging safe conduct for the three fugitives in return for revealing the impending broadcast.

Meanwhile, Hill learns that Moyers has set up a secret auction alongside the broadcast, intending to sell the alien to the highest bidder. After she refuses to participate, he imprisons her. ALF, unaware of the betrayal, revels in being the center of attention until stage fright and the increasing hostility of his host lead ALF to lock himself in the bathroom, giving the military time to shut down the broadcast. Both Hill and ALF are arrested, and Milfoil reneges on the deal, unwittingly revealing his murderous intentions on a security recording, which finds its way into Reese's hands.

Back at Edmonds, Milfoil gloats that ALF's escape means he will be able to convince his superiors to have the alien executed openly, his hatred being revealed as seeking payback for an alleged alien abduction that drove his mother insane. However, Reese interrupts a meeting between Milfoil and Lieutenant General Myron Stone, Air Force liaison to the Pentagon, to play the tape, revealing Milfoil's malfeasance.

A military panel authorizes promotions for the three officers involved in taking down Milfoil and apologizes to ALF, before declaring him an ambassador to Earth. The scene ends with ALF's usual self-aggrandizing behavior leaving the people on the panel to question whether they have made the right choice.

Cast

Production 
Project: ALF wound up airing on ABC because NBC reneged on its word that the last season of ALF would have one extra episode so the storyline could be resolved with a two-part finale. The first half aired, ending with a Melmacian spaceship hovering over ALF, while Alien Task Force operatives were closing in from all sides, but despite the flash of "TO BE CONTINUED", the network never allowed any more episodes, which infuriated fans and left the series on a cliffhanger for over 5 years.

The reason why ABC did not hire the full original cast for the film is unknown. Instead, the film's plot briefly justifies the absence of the Tanner family. A few years after the series was cancelled, the annoyance and tensions of the main cast for the grueling filming on set were revealed. 

Actors William O'Leary and Jensen Daggett were already working together on ABC, playing husband and wife Marty and Nancy Taylor, siblings-in-law to Tim "The Tool-Man" Taylor on the top-rated sitcom Home Improvement.

References

External links

 Project: ALF on ALFtv.com
 

1996 films
1996 television films
1990s science fiction films
ALF (TV series)
American sequel films
American science fiction television films
Films scored by Mark Snow
Films about extraterrestrial life
Films based on television series
Puppet films
Films shot in California
Television series reunion films
Television sequel films
Films directed by Dick Lowry
Television films based on television series
1990s English-language films